The Course de Monterey is a sports car race held annually at WeatherTech Raceway Laguna Seca by the International Motor Sports Association (IMSA). The event began in 1950 as a race on the roads of Pebble Beach, California.  In 1951, it was added to the new SCCA National Sports Car Championship.  When Laguna Seca Raceway was built in 1957, the races moved there.  The event fell dormant after the National Championship was discontinued in 1957, but was revived by the SCCA's new United States Road Racing Championship in 1963.  The race fell dormant again in 1969, and was revived in 1973 with the IMSA GT Championship.

Between 1999 and 2013 the event was a part of the American Le Mans Series, until the series merged with the Rolex Sports Car Series in 2014 to form the United SportsCar Championship.

Pebble Beach

Laguna Seca

References

External links
United SportsCar Championship official site
Ultimate Racing History: Laguna Seca archive
Racing Sports Cars: Laguna Seca archive, Pebble Beach archive
World Sports Racing Prototypes: SCCA National archive, USRRC archive, IMSA archive
Etceterini

 
Recurring sporting events established in 1950
1950 establishments in California